The California Intercollegiate Soccer Conference was a pre-NCAA collegiate soccer conference for colleges across the California.

The league began play in 1926 and disbanded in 1955 when it was split into two separate leagues: the Northern California Soccer Conference and the Southern California Soccer Association.

Champions

References 

California Intercollegiate Soccer Conference
1926 establishments in California
1955 disestablishments in California
Intercollegiate Soccer Football Association conferences
Defunct college sports conferences in the United States
Soccer in California
College sports in California